Harian Metro is a Malaysian daily newspaper owned by the New Straits Times Press. It is Malaysia's first Malay daily afternoon tabloid in Klang Valley, in contrast to morning tabloids in other part of Malaysia. The Harian Metro was established in March of 1991. It is now Malaysia's largest circulating newspaper in any language.

The change in the demographics of urbanites resulted in a growing audience of young people who were looking for entertainment, shopping news, lifestyle features and current news. Harian Metro set out to meet those needs.

On 17 July 2006, the newspaper underwent a layout revamp to remain fresh and relevant for its readers. New pullouts were introduced, such as "Rap" and "Variasi".

On 11 April 2009, Harian Metro increased its cover price with introduction of new pullouts such as "GIGS" and "EKSTRA".

Harian Metros rise has steadily gained momentum over the past few years. For 2011, Harian Metro remained the No. 1 daily Bahasa Melayu newspaper for the fifth time as declared by the Audit Bureau of Circulations. However, it later lost the status to its rival, in the second quarter of 2013, largely due to increased availability of internet news sources and subsequent growth in their audience.

 History 

1990s1991 On 26 March, Harian Metro, the country's first afternoon Bahasa newspaper, was launched. The price was RM0.50.
 Mior Kamarul Shahid was appointed the first news editor. 
 On 26 June, Harian Metro first revamped.1992 Ahmad Puah Onah was appointed editor.
 On 25 March, the southern edition of Harian Metro was launched in Johor Bahru.1994 On 1 April, Zian Johari was appointed editor.
 On 16 May, Harian Metro Edisi Timur was launched.
 On 1 August, Harian Metro Edisi Utara was launched.1995 On 29 August, Metro Ahad was launched.

2000s2000 On 17 July, Harian Metro was revamped with a new tag line 'Kini, Sini, Terkini'.
 On 23 July, Metro Ahad was revamped.2001 On 26 March, Harian Metro celebrated its tenth anniversary2003 Metro Ahad achieved 1,068,000 readers for the fourth quarter of 2003.2004'''
 On 27 January, a new official web page for Harian Metro and Metro Ahad at www.hmetro.com.my was launched in Balai Berita, Kuala Lumpur. 
 On 1 June, Berita Harian Sdn Bhd appointed Hafifi Hafidz as the new executive editor of Harian Metro and Metro Ahad, replacing Zian Johari, who was appointed executive editor of Berita Minggu.
 On 27 July, Harian Metro launched its weekly column called "Liku-liku Niaga". The column publishes every Tuesday in Harian Metros "Business" section.
 On 23 August, a new pullout of Harian Metro called "Bintang and Variasi Metro" (V-Met) was launched.2005 On 1 January, the cover price of Harian Metro increased to RM1.20. In Sabah and Sarawak, Harian Metro was sold for RM2.00 each, however, and the cover price of Metro Ahad was increased to RM1.50. In Sabah and Sarawak, the newspaper was sold at RM2.00.2006 On 6 June, i-Metro, an interactive portal providing readers a chance to be the eyes and ears of their community, was launched. 
 On 15 July, Harian Metro launched a more stylish, colourful and reader-friendly layout, as well as new sections focusing on celebrities, lifestyle, health and fashion. Among the changes made are new nameplates for Harian Metro and Metro Ahad, replacing Metro Ahads "Meta" with "Ekspresi" and renaming Harian Metros "Bintang" to "Rentak Artis Popular" (RAP) and "V-Met" to "Variasi". 
 On 16 July, Metro Ahad was revamped.2008 On 1 March, Abdul Ghafar Ismail was appointed executive editor of Harian Metro/Metro Ahad.2009 On 12 April, Metro Ahad launched a new pullout titled "GIGS – Gema Informasi Generasi Semasa". The pullout is inserted into Metro Ahad every Sunday. 
 On 13 April, the cover price of Harian Metro increased to RM1.50. In Sabah and Sarawak, the newspaper was sold at RM2.30. The "RAP" and "Variasi" pullouts introduced a new nameplate. 
 On 1 July, Abdul Ghafar Ismail was re-designated Deputy Group Editor of Harian Metro.
 On 17 August, Datuk Mustapa Omar was appointed Group Editor, Harian Metro.
 On 9 October, Harian Metro launched a new pullout, "AYU".

2010s2010'''
 On 3 May, Harian Metro was became available in Sabah and Sarawak. 
 On 23 May, Harian Metros Sarawak and Sabah edition was officially launched in Kuching. The 64-page Sarawak and Sabah edition is priced at RM1.50 each, provides readers with coverage of sports, education, and community.

2019
 On October, Harian Metro was revamped. Its weekend entertainment section, "Bling" renamed to "RapXtra".

2020s
2021
 On 25 March, Harian Metro celebrates its 25th anniversary.

See also 
Other Malay language newspapers in Malaysia:
Berita Harian
Kosmo!
Utusan Malaysia
Utusan Borneo, a newspaper publication for the state of Sabah and Sarawak
Sinar Harian

References

External links
 

Newspapers published in Malaysia
Malay-language newspapers
Publications established in 1991
1991 establishments in Malaysia
Media Prima